McCorkindale or MacCorkindale is a surname. It is an anglicised form of the Scottish Gaelic/Irish name 'Mac Thorcadail'.  It is related to the names: MacCorcadale, MacCorcodale, MacCorquodale, and MacQuorcodale, all meaning "Son of Thorketill", Thorketill being a Norse personal name. Notable people with the surname include:
 Don McCorkindale (1904−1970), South African boxer
Isabel McCorkindale (1885–1971), Scottish-born Australian temperance leader
 John McCorkindale (1867–1953), Scottish footballer (Partick Thistle, national team)
 John McCorkindale (born 1934), Scottish footballer (Kilmarnock FC, Gillingham FC)
 Simon MacCorkindale (1952−2010), English actor and film director
Douglas H. McCorkindale (born 1939), American business executive

See also

Torquil
Mac Torcaill
List of Scottish Gaelic surnames 
Norse-Gaels

References